Acoustic is a compilation album by Everything but the Girl, released in North America on 2 June 1992. In the United Kingdom, the duo had released the Covers EP for Blanco y Negro, which had peaked at number 13 on the UK Singles chart dated 7 March 1992, with this release expanded into a full album for its release abroad.

The albums Worldwide (1991) and Acoustic were reissued together by Edsel Records as a 2-disc set in 2012. This release also included the 1992 EP "The Only Living Boy in New York" and 1993's "I Didn't Know I Was Looking for Love".

Tracklistings 

Some digital downloads of the album – including those sold by Amazon and iTunes – have the fully orchestrated version of "Come on Home" (3:22) from Baby, the Stars Shine Bright rather than the pared back version from Acoustic. The error appears to be the recording company's.

Personnel
Everything but the Girl
Tracey Thorn – vocals
Ben Watt – guitar, piano, vocals
with:
Damon Butcher – keyboards
Dick Oatts – soprano saxophone
Martin Ditcham – percussion
Steve Pearce – bass
Technical
Jerry Boys, Tony Harris – engineer
Richard Haughton – photography

References

Everything but the Girl albums
1992 albums
Blanco y Negro Records albums